Sunday Odhiambo is a Kenyan former international footballer who played as a midfielder.

Career
Odhiambo played club football for Mathare United.

He earned one international cap for Kenya in 2001.

References

Year of birth missing (living people)
Living people
Kenyan footballers
Kenya international footballers
Mathare United F.C. players
Kenyan Premier League players
Association football midfielders